Janna (Kannada : ಮಹಾಕವಿ    ಜನ್ನ) was one of the well-known Kannada poets of the early 13th century who also served in the capacity of a minister and a builder of temples. He graced the court of Hoysala empire King Veera Ballala II and earned the title Kavichakravarthi ("Emperor among poets"). His noteworthy writings include Yashodhara Charitre (c.1209) which deals with Jain tenets, Ananthnatha Purana (c.1230) which deals with the teachings of the 14th Jain tirthankara, Anantanatha and a short piece called Anubhava Mukura. Although all his works are known for the grace and style, Yashodhara Charite is his magnum opus and one of the classics of Kannada literature.

Janna finds an important place in Kannada literature, though he is not as famous as Adikavi Pampa. He came from a family of Kannada writers; Mallikarjuna, the well known anthologist was his brother-in-law and Kesiraja the grammarian, was his nephew. Janna's style essentially belonged to the classical marga (mainstream) brand of Kannada writers and his works were primarily meant to propagate the Jain philosophy.

Magnum opus

Yashodhara Charite, an epic written in the kandapadya metre is a unique set of stories in 310 verses dealing with perverted sex and violence and contains cautionary morals on the issue of extreme desires. Inspired by the Sanskrit writing of the same name by Vadiraja, the Janna transcreates stories of king Yashodhara and his mother and their passing from one life to the next without attaining moksha (liberation from cycle of death and rebirth). In one of the stories, the king intends to perform a ritual sacrifice of two young boys to a local deity, Mariamma. Taking pity on the boys, the king releases them and gives up the practice of human sacrifice. In another story, the poet narrates the infatuation of the king for his friends wife. Having killed his friend, the king abducts the wife who however dies of grief. Overcome by repentance, he burns himself on the funeral pyre of the woman. The stories of infatuation reaches a peak when Janna narrates the attraction of Amrutamati, the queen, to the ugly mahout Ashtavakra, who pleases the queen with kicks and whip lashes—a story that has piqued the interest of modern research. To expiate the queen from her sinful act, King Yashodhara takes his mothers advice and decides to perform a symbolic sacrifice of a cock made of flour, to please the gods. But the cock comes to life and crows at its time of death. For committing the sin of violence, Yashodhara and his mother are reborn as animals. After much suffering, they are eventually born as the children of Yashodhara's son in their seventh rebirth. The writing powerfully narrates the consequences of passion gone awry and the terrible suffering it brings in human life.

Other writings
Janna's Anubhava Mukhura is a treatise on erotics and the science of lovemaking, a topic that was well established as a genre of Kannada literature by his time.

Notes

References

 
 
 
 
 
 

13th-century Indian poets
History of Karnataka
13th-century Indian Jain poets
Kannada poets
Poets from Karnataka
Indian male poets